White Queen may refer to:

Literature and entertainment
White Queen (Through the Looking-Glass), a character in Lewis Carroll's Through the Looking-Glass (1871)
White Queen (novel), a 1991 novel by Gwyneth Jones, the first of her Aleutian Trilogy.
The White Queen (novel), a 2009 novel by Philippa Gregory based on the life of Elizabeth Woodville (c. 1437–1492), Queen consort of England
The White Queen (TV series), a 2013 British serial drama based on the Gregory novel and its sequels
Lacus Clyne or White Queen, a character in the Gundam science fiction media franchise
White Queen, a character in the Nick Velvet novel series by Edward D. Hoch
"White Queen (As It Began)", a song by Queen from Queen II
Red Queen and White Queen, a holographic computer from Resident Evil: Extinction

In comics
Emma Frost or the White Queen, a Marvel Comics character
Adrienne Frost or the White Queen, a Marvel Comics character
Sat-Yr-9 or the White Queen, a Marvel Comics character
Amanda Waller or the White Queen, a DC Comics character
Valentina Vostok or the White Queen, a DC Comics character

Other
White Queen tomato, a tomato variety
Queen (chess)
 Claude Njiké-Bergeret, development aid volunteer